The 2007 Yazidi massacre was a massacre of Yazidis that took place on April 22, 2007, in Mosul, in northern Iraq.

Massacre 
At around 2PM (GMT+3), a bus carrying workers from the Mosul Textile Factory en route to Bashiqa, Al-Hamdaniya District was stopped by cars owned by unidentified attackers. With the bus now stationary, the attackers got on, and checked the passengers' identity cards. According to Iraqi police, after checking their identification, the armed gunmen told the Muslim and Christian passengers to get off the bus. They then drove the bus to eastern Mosul with 23 remaining passengers, all Yazidis, where the hostages were made to lie face down in front of a wall and shot, execution-style.

Reactions 
According to The New York Times, hundreds of Yazidis from Bashiqa gathered in the street to protest the killings.

See also 

2007 Yazidi communities bombings
Genocide of Yazidis by ISIL
Sinjar massacre

References

2007 murders in Iraq
Spree shootings in Iraq
Massacres in 2007
Terrorist incidents in Iraq in 2007
Persecution of Yazidis in Iraq
Filmed killings
April 2007 events in Iraq
History of Mosul
Deaths by firearm in Iraq
April 2007 crimes
Massacres in Iraq